Smart phones offer more connectivity to the crowd and reach of information than basic feature phones. Over several years, mobile phone industry has grown significantly and people demand the growth of smart phones such as expanding its memory, larger screen size, and open operating systems.

People in South Korea are really into the technologies related with daily life and they love to improve the quality of life. In that aspect, Apple’s first smart phone was a really big deal in South Korea and this was way more than how other countries were excited. How do we know this? We can easily understand how people in South Korea liked Apple’s first IPhone by looking at what Samsung invented.

After some time has passed, LG electronics participated in this competition as the smart phone business kept growing. Compare to Apple and Samsung, LG had little different business strategy, which to make the devices with lower price and better functionality other than high specs; however, as LG started focus on better camera functions and screen quality with better pixel, their cost of goods started to increase but the sales was not so much improved.

As the result of continuing net loss in smart phone business, LG decided to quit from this area and announced this in public on April, 2021. Up until this time, Apple and Samsung were two major companies in this field and LG had some portion out of that. Like it was mentioned above, people in South Korea are very sensitive in these kinds of technology matters and because of this characteristics, Apple knows too that South Korea is a big market to sell their products. Although LG electronics quitted from the smart phone business, they still have other electronic devices in the shops with empty spaces on where smart phones used to be displayed. Apple knew this event was a chance to increase their sales in South Korea and tried to take this opportunity by renting LG’s displaying spaces in markets.

Samsung didn’t just wait for Apple to take actions, but they tried to tempt LG smart phone users by offering them good deals on their new Samsung phones. Trade-in event with used LG smart phone can be a good example. Ever since then, Samsung and Apple are in war on this smart phone business field, and this war is still on-going.

History

 1984, Korea Mobile Telecommunications Service, Korea Telecom's subsidiary which later became SK Telecom, started its mobile communications service, using the car phone
 1988, Korea Mobile Telecommunications Service started South Korea's first mobile phone service.
 1996, Korea Mobile Telecommunications Service started the world's first cdmaOne service in Incheon.  In the same year, Korea Telecom Freetel (KTF), which later got merged with Korea Telecom, its parent company, began its service.
 1997, Korea Mobile Telecommunications Service was sold to SK Group and changed its name to SK Telecom.  In the same year, LG Telecom started its business.
 2002, Korea Telecom Freetel merged Internet companies invested by Samsung Group and became KTF.
 2009, KTF was merged with Korea Telecom.
 2010, LG Telecom, LG Dacom, LG Powercom were merged into LG U Plus.
 2012, KT shut down its 2G services and migrated to 3G network.
 2020, SKT shut down its 2G services and migrated to newer generation networks.

As new technology is developed, such as, WiBro and LTE protocol suite, more demand is growing in quality communication service area.

Mobile phone service providers
There are three mobile phone service providers and they are currently deploying their 5G networks.
 Korea Telecom
Korea Telecom (KT) in 2002 absorbed KT Freetel (KTF), its mobile phone service provider, and offers its services, using HSPA and LTE networks.

 LG U Plus
LG U Plus (LG U+), a member of LG Group, also provides CDMA2000 and LTE networks.

 SK Telecom
SK Telecom (SKT) of SK Group also offers its service, using HSPA and LTE networks. In 2020 CDMA2000 network has been shut down.

 the market shares of the three companies were believed to be: SK Telecom's 50 percent, Korea Telecom's 30 percent and LG Telecom's 20 percent.

Mobile phone industry
In South Korea, the Ministry of Information and Communication (MIC) is the telecommunications authority.

The Electronics and Telecommunications Research Institute (ETRI) supports Qualcomm's research and development of CDMA and CDMA2000 technology.

Regarding the Korean mobile phone industry's overseas experiences, SK Telecom has helped the first mobile phone service companies in Mongolia, Uzbekistan, Cambodia, etc.  In China, it helped China Unicom's CDMA implementation, both technically and financially.

Handset distributors

 Samsung Electronics
 Pantech Curitel
 Apple Inc.

Samsung and Apple have the largest market shares in Korea. Nokia and LG Electronics have discontinued their sales operations in Korea.

See also
 YASHA
 Telecommunications in South Korea
 List of telephone operating companies
 List of mobile network operators
 List of mobile phone makers
 Culture of South Korea

References

External links
 Korea Telecom official site (Korean & English)
 LG U Plus official site(Korean & English)
 SK Telecom official site (Korean & English)

South Korea
Telecommunications in South Korea

ko:대한민국의 통신업